Gerola Lindahl (born 20 July 1943) is a Swedish gymnast. She competed at the 1960 Summer Olympics and the 1964 Summer Olympics.

References

1943 births
Living people
Swedish female artistic gymnasts
Olympic gymnasts of Sweden
Gymnasts at the 1960 Summer Olympics
Gymnasts at the 1964 Summer Olympics
Sportspeople from Stockholm
20th-century Swedish women